John Louis Rothacher (November 1, 1886 – August 26, 1962) was an American college football player and coach. He served as the head football coach at Springfield College in Springfield, Massachusetts from 1924 to 1936, compiling a record of 66–29–12. Rothacher played football at Springfield from 1911 to 1913 as a guard before graduating in 1914.

Rothacher died on August 26, 1962, in Alton, Illinois.

Head coaching record

References

External links
 

1886 births
1962 deaths
American football guards
Springfield Pride athletic directors
Springfield Pride football coaches
Springfield Pride football players
People from Alton, Illinois